Devitt Insurance Services Limited is a privately owned insurance broker based in Romford, England and have been arranging insurance in the UK since 1936.

Devitt is a specialist motorbike insurance company, but also arrange car insurance, van insurance, home insurance and business insurance. Devitt administrate motorbike insurance schemes for other large UK brands including BMW Motorrad in the UK, Post Office and The Salvation Army.

They compare quotes from their insurance panel, which includes Ageas, Aviva, AXA, Chaucer, Equity Red Star, LV, NIG and Provident.

History
Devitt's roots can be traced back to Thomas Henry Devitt who founded Devitt and Moore in 1836. His grandson Howson Foulger Devitt formed the company that would eventually become Devitt Insurance Services Limited.

In 1936, the Devitt 'DU' motorcycle was launched. It was an innovative idea to sell motorcycle insurance through motorcycle dealers. It allowed customers to ride away from the dealers on their motorcycle on the same day. The scheme was launched in conjunction with "H.P." Motor Policies at Lloyd's.

Devitt 'DU' changes to Devitt 'DA' (Dealers Association) in 1955 and made a massive impact on marketing campaigns for years to come.

1965 saw the creation of Devitt Langton & Dawnay Day Ltd, formed as a holding company for the Devitt broking interests. This meant a shareholding in Langton Underwriting Agencies at Lloyd's and backed by Dawnay Day, a small merchant bank.

The Caravan Club scheme was launched with Devitt in 1972.

The holding company established in 1965 changed its name to Devitt Group Ltd in 1979, due to the expansion of the Devitt broking operations, the sale of the Langton interests and the demise of Dawnay Day.

Steel Burrill Jones Group plc. (SBJ) purchased Devitt Group Ltd in 1989.

In 1990, Devitt Insurance Services Ltd was formed, merging the personal lines and affinity group business which had been developed within the Devitt Group Ltd by its subsidiary companies; Howson F Devitt & Sons Ltd, Devitt DA and Double Cox Tyrie.

Churchill acquired Devitt Insurance Services in 1999.

In 2003, Royal Bank of Scotland bought Churchill group, including Devitt, for £1.1 billion.

Devitt Insurance completed a management buy-out in 2011. Devitt is now owned by William Hughes (Managing Director) and Tony Chapman (Finance Director). Following this, Devitt bought Screentrade from Lloyds TSB. Devitt were arranging car insurance for Screentrade whilst they were both owned by Lloyds. Screentrade was one of the first online insurance/brokers comparison sites.

2016 marked the 80th anniversary of Devitt arranging motorcycle insurance for UK bikers.

Keep Britain Biking
Keep Britain Biking is an online biking community site powered by Devitt Insurance. KBB was launched in February 2010 at keepbritainbiking.com. Keep Britain Biking then moved onto all social media channels, keeping bikers engaged with racing news and motorcycle related content.

Keep Britain Biking  also sells biker clothing with original designs for men, women and children.

Sponsorships
RC Express Racing - in 2016 Devitt became title sponsors of, a Bristol-based road race team along with their rider, Ivan Lintin. The team won the Lightweight TT race in 2016 and have had a series of road racing successes over the years. Paul Jordan is currently racing for the team whilst Lintin recovers from injuries at the Southern 100 2018. 
Max Cook - Devitt sponsor young, talented BSB MotoStar racer Max Cook. Aged 16, Max now has 8 seasons of competitive racing behind him. In 2017, Max won the Moto3 BSB series with over a 100-point led on his closest rival. In 2018, Max joined the Red Bull Rookies class of MotoGP and has gone from strength to strength - 2019 saw Max take his first ever Red Bull Rookies podium.

Biker cafes - Devitt sponsor a number of biker cafes across the UK. These include Ryka's, Thunder Road, Pit Stop, H Cafe, Route 1066 Cafe, Super Sausage Cafe and Squires.

SERV - A close partnership with SERV Sussex has been formed since 2005. SERV are a charity made up entirely of volunteers who use their motorcycles to deliver urgent medical supplies all over the country; Devitt provide their fleet insurance free of charge.

The Bike Experience - Devitt sponsor The Bike Experience, a charity that offer disabled bikers the chance to get back on two wheels. They provided a Honda Varadero XL 125 to the charity in 2014.

THINK! - Devitt partner with THINK! to offer motorbike insurance discounts to bikers to encourage them to complete further training courses such as those run by the Royal Society for the Prevention of Accidents- ROSPA, the Institute of Advanced Motorists - IAM, and the Enhanced Riders Scheme - ERS.
 As Seen From The Sidecar - In 2017, Devitt sponsored the As Seen From The Sidecar team who circumnavigated the globe in just 18 months raising awareness on modern day slavery in their Honda scooter and sidecar. 

The Arctic Rider - Gordon Stuart, also known as The Arctic Rider,. Gordon takes on challenges on his motorbike to raise money for charity including riding the Arctic Circle in 2014, Iron Butt Challenge in 2016 and his upcoming Dalton Highway challenge in summer 2018.
 
Moto Gymkhana - Moto Gymkhana is one of the latest crazes to hit UK bikers, it's all about tackling obstacles at high speed with perfect control. Devitt work alongside Moto Gymkhana UK offering discount to those who have completed course/events. 
 
Brake (charity) - Devitt worked with road safety charity, Brake to sponsor their Road Safety Week campaign. The focus was on safety for those on two wheels, raising awareness on how vulnerable motorcyclists and cyclists are. 
 Death Machines of London - Flat Track - With the rise in flat tracking events around the UK, Devitt are working with London-based custom bike builders, Death Machines of London on their flat track machine. The team will compete at a number of events across the country throughout 2019.

Events

Devitt also exhibit at many other shows, including MCN London Motorcycle Show and Motorcycle Live.

Partnerships
Devitt have been arranging motorhome, car and pet insurance for The Caravan Club for over 40 years. 
Devitt run the motorcycle insurance schemes for BMW Motorrad UK and the Post Office, they also run insurance schemes for SAGIC and Clementine.

Other Brands
Screentrade - Devitt purchased Screentrade  in 2011 from Lloyds. Screentrade arranges car, van and motorbike insurance.

Office and Employment
With offices in Romford and Ipswich, Devitt has around 150 members of staff.

References

Financial services companies established in 1936
Insurance companies of the United Kingdom
1936 establishments in the United Kingdom